Parliamentary elections were held in São Tomé and Príncipe in July 1975. The country was a one-party state at the time, with the Movement for the Liberation of São Tomé and Príncipe (MLSTP) as the sole legal party. A total of 52 candidates contested the election, almost all of whom had been nominated by the MLSTP. Around 21,000 people were registered to vote.

The MLSTP candidates received around 90% of the vote and won all 16 seats in the Constituent Assembly. After approving a new constitution on 5 November, the Assembly was dissolved. A National Assembly was convened to act as a legislature for the next four years, which included MLSTP beurean members and representatives of its zone committees, women's organisation and youth organisation, together with members of the incumbent government and five 'suitable' citizens. This included six women, Alda Bandeira, Alda Neves da Graça do Espírito Santo, Julieta da Graça do Espírito Santo, Maria Aurora Lopes, Lurdes de Maria Lima Pires dos Santos and Maria Fernanda Pontífice de Jesus Bonfim.

Elected members
Lúcio Afonso de Oliveira
Maria Augusta da Silva
Silvestre Balduíno de Barros Umbelina
Nuno Xavier Daniel Dias
Tomé Dias da Costa
Domingos Dias Vaz
Manuel Francisco da Fonseca Veloso
Germano Quaresma dos Santos Vaz
Crispim de Jesus Bonfim
Francisco Lima de Nazaré
Filipe Lopes Bandeira
António Luciano Ramos
José Messias Rita
Celestino Pinto
Guilherme do Sacramento Neto
Aparício dos Santos
Marcelo da Veiga

References

São Tomé
Legislative
Elections in São Tomé and Príncipe
1975
São Tomé
Election and referendum articles with incomplete results